Beach Energy Limited is an Australian oil and gas exploration and production company based in Adelaide, South Australia. Formerly known as Beach Petroleum, the company changed its name to Beach Energy in December 2009. It is a component of the S&P/ASX 200 index of major Australian companies and in 2020 was the second largest oil producer in Australia after Woodside Petroleum. 

Beach was established in 1961, however for many years it was not very successful. After eventually making some discoveries in the Cooper Basin, Beach now holds interests in five producing basins across Australia and New Zealand, including the Cooper Basin, Bass Basin, Otway Basin, Perth Basin and Taranaki Basin.

In 2014, Beach Energy was the largest onshore oil producer in Australia. 

In March 2015, it was announced that incoming Beach Energy managing director Rob Cole will assume leadership of the company three months earlier than expected after freeing himself of commitments at his previous firm, Woodside Petroleum.

In November 2016, Beach Energy announced a Western Flank oil discovery within the Poolowanna Formation in ex PEL 91 (Beach 100%).

In September 2017, Beach Energy announced it would acquire Lattice Energy from Origin Energy for $1.585 billion, significantly increasing the company's operations portfolio.

References

External links
 
  ASX website information about Beach Energy

Companies listed on the Australian Securities Exchange
Oil companies of Australia
Seven Network